Kyle Edmund was the defending champion but chose not to defend his title.

Marco Cecchinato won the title after defeating Jozef Kovalík 6–4, 6–4 in the final.

Seeds

Draw

Finals

Top half

Bottom half

References
Main Draw
Qualifying Draw

Garden Open - Singles
2017 Singles
Garden